The Markersbach viaduct is an historic railway bridge located in Raschau-Markersbach, Germany.

Also known as the 'Matchstick Bridge', it is 236.5 m in length and 36.5 m in height.

References 

Railway bridges in Germany